Kim Ki-whang (1920 – September 16, 1993), also known in the United States as Ki-whang Kim, was a Korean martial arts grandmaster. He was chairman in the US of the Tang Soo Do Moo Duk Kwan Association, Chairman of the US Olympic Taekwondo team 1988. He helped unify several Korean martial arts into the overall style of taekwondo.

Biography
Kim was born in Seoul, Korea in 1920. At the time, Korea was occupied by Japan. Under their regime, martial arts had been banned since 1909, though the practice of taekkyon was not banned until the year of Kim's birth.

Despite the Japanese ban, Koreans still practiced martial arts in secret, and Kim was able to study Judo at the Kodokan from 1931, earning a Black Belt five years later. The ban did not extend to Koreans who lived in Japan, and Kim learned Shudokan Karate from its founder, Kanken Toyama, at Nihon University in Japan. He became captain of the team, earned the nickname "Typhoon," and earned a fourth-degree Black Belt rank in this style. He also went to China for two years, probably as a draftee in the Japanese army, where he learned kempo and shaolin kung fu.

After graduation from Nihon University in the 1940s, he returned to South Korea and was employed at the Transportation Administration in Seoul. He wasn't involved in martial arts but remained good friends with a senior student from the Shudokan, Yoon Byung-In. Upon the government overthrow of South Korean President Rhee Syng-man, Kim accepted a letter of recommendation from Mooduk-Kwan founder, Hwang Kee, to be the Mooduk-Kwan representative in the United States.

In 1963, he emigrated to the United States, where he remained for the rest of his life. His U.S. students included Mitchell Bobrow, Richard Chun, Albert Cheeks, Michael Warren,  James K. Roberts Jr.,   John Critzos II, George Thanos, and Sally Harrison.  He taught more than 25,000 students and issued 424 black belts. He had a wife and a daughter and retired in 1992. Five Grand Masters awarded Kim 10th dan black belt while in the hospital with liver cancer at the age of 73 and died on 16 September 1993. Kim was held in high regard in the Martial Arts World, more than 650 people attended his funeral. Inducted into Taekwondo Hall of Fame  2009

References

Other sources
Taekwondo Hall of Fame
Burdick, Dakin (1997) Journal of Asian Martial Arts, Volume 6 Number 1 - 1997. People and events of Taekwondo's Formative Years
Corcoran, John. "Memorial for Grandmaster Kim Ki-whang (1920-1993)." Inside Tae Kwon Do, 3:1 (Feb. 1994), pp. 56–59.
US Taekwondo Grandmasters Society 4th Annual Hall of Fame Awards, 2009, "Pioneer Award" section detailing career.

1920 births
1993 deaths
People from Seoul
Sportspeople from Seoul
South Korean male taekwondo practitioners
South Korean tang soo do practitioners
South Korean male karateka
South Korean male judoka
South Korean emigrants to the United States
Nihon University alumni
20th-century South Korean people